Mauricio Walerstein (29 March 1945 – 3 July 2016) was a Mexican film director, screenwriter and film producer. He directed 17 films between 1971 and 2014. His 1973 film Cuando quiero llorar no lloro, an adaptation of the novel of the same name by Venezuelan writer Miguel Otero Silva, was entered into the 8th Moscow International Film Festival.

His father was Mexican film producer and screenwriter Gregorio Walerstein.

He died on 3 July 2016. Prior to his death, he had been living with Venezuelan actress Marisela Berti for more than two decades; the pair had a son, actor Alejandro Walerstein.

Selected filmography
 Cuando quiero llorar no lloro (1973)
 Crónica de un subversivo latinoamericano (1975)
 La empresa perdona un momento de locura (1978)

References

External links

1945 births
2016 deaths
Mexican film directors
Mexican screenwriters
Mexican film producers
People from Mexico City